Visgeh (also Romanized as Vīsgeh and Vīsegeh; also known as Veysekeh and Vīsekeh) is a village in Harasam Rural District, Homeyl District, Eslamabad-e Gharb County, Kermanshah Province, Iran. At the 2006 census, its population was 140, in 32 families.

References 

Populated places in Eslamabad-e Gharb County